Route 196 is a Connecticut state highway in the lower Connecticut River valley, running from Haddam (near the village of Haddam Neck) to the town center of East Hampton.

Route description
Route 196 begins as Young Street at an intersection with Route 151 in the northeastern corner of Haddam, near the village of Haddam Neck. It heads north and crosses into the town of East Hampton after . The road continues through Wopowog State Wildlife Management Area in rural East Hampton for another , also serving several farms along the way. The road name later changes to Skinner Street, which continues generally north, crossing the Pocotopaug Creek to an intersection with Route 16. Route 196 then enters the town center of East Hampton, where it uses Main Street, Summit Street, and Lake View Street. It continues north through the town center for another mile until it ends at an intersection with Route 66 at the mouth of Pocotopaug Lake. Route 196 carries traffic volumes of about 2,800 vehicles per day.

History

Route 196 was established as a new route in the 1932 state highway renumbering and has had no changes since then.

Junction list

References

External links

196
Transportation in Middlesex County, Connecticut